Independent music (also commonly known as indie music, or simply indie) is music produced independently from commercial record labels or their subsidiaries; this may include an autonomous, do-it-yourself approach to recording and publishing. 

As a genre term, "indie" may or may not comprise independently produced music. Many independent music artists do not fall into a single defined musical style or genre, with their self-published music being able to be categorized into diverse genres without the expectations associated with commercial music. The term 'indie' or 'independent music' can be traced back to as early as the 1920s: in the context of referencing independent film companies. It was later used to classify an independent band or record producer.

Record labels

Independent labels have a long history of promoting developments in popular music, stretching back to the post-war period in the United States, with labels such as Sun Records, King Records, and Stax.

In the United Kingdom during the 1950s and 1960s, the major record companies had so much power that independent labels struggled to become established, until the launch of new concepts like Virgin Records. Several British producers and artists launched independent labels as outlets for their work and artists they liked; the majority failed as commercial ventures or were bought by the major labels.

In the United States, independent labels and distributors often banded together to form organizations to promote trade and parity within the industry. The Recording Academy, famous as the organization behind the Grammy Awards, began in the 1950s as an organization of 25 independent record labels including Herald, Ember, and Atlantic Records. The 1970s saw the founding of the National Association of Independent Record Distributors (NAIRD), which became A2IM in 2004. Smaller organizations also existed including the Independent Music Association (IMA), founded by Don Kulak in the late 1980s. At its zenith, it had 1,000 independent labels on its member rosters. The 1990s brought Affiliated Independent Record Companies (AIRCO), whose most notable member was upstart punk-thrash rock label Mystic Records, and The Independent Music Retailer's Association (IMRA), a short-lived organization founded by Mark Wilkins and Don Kulak. The latter is most notable for a lawsuit involving co-op money it filed on behalf of its member Digital Distributors in conjunction with Warehouse Record Stores. The  adjudication of the case grossed $178,000,000 from the distribution arms of major labels. The proceeds were distributed amongst all plaintiffs.

During the punk rock era, the number of independent labels grew. The UK Indie Chart was first compiled in 1980, and independent distribution became better organized from the late 1970s onward. From the late 1970s into the 1980s, certain UK independent labels (such as Rough Trade, Fast Product, Cherry Red, Factory, Glass, Industrial, Cheree Records and Creation) came to contribute something in terms of aesthetic identity to the acts whose records they released.

Around the late 1980s, Seattle-based Sub Pop Records was at the center of the grunge scene. In the late 1990s and into the 2000s as the advent of MP3 files and digital download sites such as Apple's iTunes Store changed the recording industry, an indie neo-soul scene soon emerged from the urban underground soul scenes of London, New York, Philadelphia, Chicago and Los Angeles, primarily due to commercial radio and the major labels' biased focus on the marketing, promotion & airplay of pop and hip hop music during this period. Independent labels such as Dome Record and Expansion Records in the U.K. and Burger, Wiener, and Ubiquity Records in the U.S. and a plethora of others around the world continue to release independent bands and music.

Going major versus staying independent
Many acts choose to go from an independent label to a major label if given the opportunity, as major labels have considerably more power and financial means to promote and distribute products, sometimes increasing the chances of greater success.  Some acts, however, may choose not to go to a major label if given the opportunity, as independence generally offers more freedom.

Similarly, others may become independent label acts after having already experienced recording on a major label. Bradley Joseph asked to be let go from his major label deal with Narada/Virgin Records and subsequently became an independent artist. He says, "As an independent, business is a prime concern and can take over if not controlled.  A lot of musicians don't learn the business. You just have to be well-rounded in both areas. You have to understand publishing. You have to understand how you make money, what's in demand, and what helps you make the most out of your talent. But some artists just want to  be involved in the music and don't like the added problems or have the personality to work with both". Joseph suggests newer artists read and study both courses and pick one that best suits their own needs and wants.

A successful independent label with a strong musical reputation can be very appealing to a major label. Major labels look at independent labels to stay current with the ever-changing music scene.

If an act moves to a major label from an independent, they are awarded greater opportunity for success, but it does not guarantee success. About one in ten albums released by major labels make a profit for the label.  Some artists have recorded for independent record companies for their entire careers and have had solid careers. Independent labels tend to be more open creatively, however, an independent label that is creatively productive is not necessarily financially lucrative. Independent labels are often operations of one, two, or only half a dozen people, with almost no outside assistance and run out of tiny offices.  This lack of resources can make it difficult for a band to make revenue from sales. It can also be more difficult for the indie label to get its artists' music played on radio stations around the country when compared to the pull of a major label. A testament to this fact could be that since 1991, there have only been twelve independent label albums that have reached the number one spot on the US Billboard 200 Album Chart. However, dozens of independent albums have reached the top 40 of the Billboard 200.

Many current artists use their own resources to produce, record, market and release music through Spotify, SoundCloud, and other streaming platforms with social media in a direct, do-it-yourself manner allowing creative distribution.

Distribution methods 
Some independent labels distribute their own product while others distribute via a major label. Independents may be owned by a major label who then distribute for them.

It can be very difficult for independent bands to sign to a record label that may not be familiar with their specific style. It can take years of dedicated effort, self-promotion, and rejections before landing a contract with either an independent or major record label. Bands that are ready to go this route need to be sure they are prepared both in terms of the music they offer as well as their realistic expectations for success.

Major label contracts

Most major label artists earn a 10–16% royalty rate. However, before a band is able to receive any of their royalties, they must clear their label for all of their debts, known as recoupable expenses. These expenses arise from the cost of such things as album packaging and artwork, tour support, and video production. An additional part of the recoupable expenses are the artist's advance. An advance is like a loan. It allows the artist to have money to live and record with until their record is released. However, before they can gain any royalties, the advance must be paid back in full to the record label. Since only the most successful artists recoup production and marketing costs, an unsuccessful artist's debt may carry over to their next album, meaning that they see little to no royalties.

Major label advances are generally much larger than independent labels can offer. Major labels are able to offer artists advances in the range of $150,000–$500,000.  Some smaller independent labels offer no advance at all; just recording cost, album packaging, and artwork, which is also recoupable.  If an artist gets no advance at all, they owe their record company less money, thus allowing them to start receiving royalty checks earlier; that is, if sales warrant any royalty checks at all.  However, since the record label typically recoups so many different costs, it is actually to the artist's advantage to get the largest advance possible because they may not see any royalties checks for quite some time; again, that is, if sales warrant any royalties checks at all. Another advantage of getting an advance; the advance money the artist owes the label is only recoupable through the artist's royalties, not through a return of the advance itself.

Independent label contracts
Independent label contracts typically resemble contracts offered by major labels because they have similar legal liabilities to define before representing an artist. There are differences, however, usually with regards to less advances, lower studio costs, lower royalties, but fewer album options. Due to financial constraints, independents typically spend much less on marketing and promotion than major labels. But with lower royalties rates typically paid to artists and lower production and promotion costs, independent labels generally can turn a profit off lower volumes of sales than a major label can.

Although not common, there have been instances of profit-sharing deals with independent labels in which an act can get as much as 40–50% of the net profits. In this type of contract, the net gain after all expenses have been taken out are divided between the label and artist by a negotiated percentage. However, deals in this form can take longer for an artist to gain any profits, if at all, since all expenses – such as recording, manufacturing, publicity and marketing, music videos, etc., are also taken into account. Only if an independent artist becomes vastly popular are deals of this type more advantageous.

Independent labels rely heavily on personal networking, or "word of mouth", to expose their acts. Independent labels tend to avoid high budget marketing tactics, which usually does not fall in the budget of an independent label. This of course contributes to the overall lower production cost, and may help the artist to receive royalties sooner, if warranted. Major labels tend to watch indie label artists and gauge their success, and may offer to sign acts from independents when their contract is up. The major may also request to buy the contract of the act from the independent label before the contract is up, giving the independent label a hefty financial payment if they choose to sell the contract.

Competition between independent and traditional publishing

Independent music sales volume is difficult to track, but in 2010 independent retailer CD Baby claimed to have sold over 5 million CDs during its lifetime. CD Baby no longer reports its number of CDs sold, but in 2010 claimed to have paid a total of $107 million to artists over its lifetime and currently claims that this figure is now over $200 million.

Apple has announced that they have sold over 16 billion songs through their iTunes service. Most of this is "mainstream" music, and doesn't reflect access by new content producers to the market, but it does indicate significant competition with traditional CD sales.

Whether the sales from non-traditional sources come mostly from tapping into an expanding market or from siphoning sales away from traditional CD distribution is difficult to assess in the face of the RIAA's claim that music piracy causes 12.5 billion dollars' damage to the US economy annually.

See also
Underground music
Indie music scenes

References

Further reading
 Fonarow, Wendy Cagur. Empire of Dirt: The Aesthetics and Rituals of British Indie Music. Wesleyan, 2006. 

Self-publishing
Cassette culture 1970s–1990s